"Kill the Boy" is the fifth episode of the fifth season of HBO's medieval fantasy television series Game of Thrones. The 45th episode overall, it was written by Bryan Cogman, and directed by Jeremy Podeswa, his directorial debut for the series. The episode first aired on HBO on May 10, 2015.

In the episode, Brienne of Tarth and Podrick Payne attempt to make contact with Sansa Stark. In Meereen, Daenerys Targaryen clashes with the nobles of Meereen following Barristan Selmy's death, but later agrees to marry Hizdahr zo Loraq. In Old Valyria, Tyrion Lannister and Jorah Mormont are attacked by stone men. At the Wall, Stannis Baratheon prepares to leave Castle Black and march on Winterfell, and Jon Snow frees Tormund from captivity so that he can lead Jon to the wildling camp at Hardhome. The name of the episode comes from a piece of advice Maester Aemon gives Jon, to "kill the boy" and "let the man be born".

This episode marks the final appearance for Ian McElhinney (Ser Barristan Selmy).

Plot

At the Wall
Jon seeks Aemon's advice, who counsels him to trust his instincts and "kill the boy" inside him and “become the man.” Jon frees Tormund and offers to allow the Wildlings to settle south of the Wall in return for an alliance with the Night's Watch when the White Walkers arrive. Tormund tells Jon that most of the wildlings have fled to the town of Hardhome and that Jon must accompany him to speak with them himself. Jon's plan is unpopular with the rest of the Night's Watch, but Jon persists.

Stannis questions Sam about dragonglass, which can kill a White Walker and tells him that Dragonstone has large supplies of dragonglass. The Baratheon army begins its march on Winterfell; Stannis insists on bringing Selyse and Shireen.

In the North
Brienne and Podrick arrive at an inn close to Winterfell and arrange for a man still loyal to the Starks to deliver a message to Sansa that if she is ever in trouble, she should light a candle in Winterfell’s Broken Tower.

At Winterfell, Myranda shows Reek to Sansa. At dinner Ramsay forces Reek to apologize to Sansa for murdering Bran and Rickon, despite being aware that Theon didn't kill them. Irritated by Ramsay's petty cruelty, Roose tells him that he and Walda are expecting a boy, much to Ramsay's chagrin. However, Roose later reassures Ramsay of his position and requests his help in defeating Stannis.

In Meereen
Grey Worm survives his clash with the Sons of the Harpy, but Barristan succumbs to his wounds. Daenerys orders Hizdahr and other leaders of the great families of Meereen to be brought before her, and orders her dragons to burn one of them as an intimidation tactic while imprisoning the others. She later visits Hizdahr in his cell and informs him that not only will she reopen the fighting pits, she will make peace with the people of Meereen by marrying him. Meanwhile, Missandei visits Grey Worm as he recuperates. Grey Worm admits his fear of never seeing Missandei again and the two kiss.

In Valyria
Tyrion deduces that Jorah is taking a shortcut through Valyria. After being distracted by Drogon flying overhead, they are attacked by stone men, people turned feral by the leprosy-like disease greyscale. Jorah saves Tyrion, but later finds a greyscale lesion on his wrist.

Production

Writing

This episode was written by the series producer Bryan Cogman, and contains content from two of George R. R. Martin's novels, A Feast for Crows, Samwell I, and Samwell IV, and A Dance with Dragons, chapters Jon II, Jon III, Jon XI, Jon XIII, Reek III, Daenerys V, and Tyrion V.

Filming
"Kill the Boy" was directed by Jeremy Podeswa. He also directed the subsequent episode, "Unbowed, Unbent, Unbroken", which received a Primetime Emmy Award nomination for Outstanding Directing for a Drama Series.

Reception

Ratings
"Kill the Boy" was watched by an estimated 6.56 million American viewers during its first airing. With Live+7 DVR viewing factored in, the episode had an overall rating of 9.35 million viewers, and a 5.0 in the 18–49 demographic. In the United Kingdom, the episode was viewed by 2.220 million viewers, making it the highest-rated broadcast that week. It also received 0.130 million timeshift viewers.

Critical reception

"Kill the Boy" was received positively. Mike Hogan of Vanity Fair said that the creative team "just keeps cranking up the tension," while Joshua Yehl of IGN rated the episode 8.4/10 and wrote that the season "reaches its midway point with refreshed plot-lines and a rare moment of fantasy beauty." Christopher Orr of The Atlantic called the episode "superb" and described it as "crisply written, directed and performed." On Rotten Tomatoes, all 29 critic reviews collected were positive. The site gave the episode an average rating of 8.2 out of 10.

References

External links

  at HBO.com
 

2015 American television episodes
Game of Thrones (season 5) episodes
Television episodes directed by Jeremy Podeswa